Yves Billon (born 9 July 1946, in Paris) is a French documentary film-maker. He is also founder of the production companies Les Films du Village and Zaradoc.

The documentaries "Religious and Sufi Music of Pakistan" and "The Music of Balochistan" that he produced with a Pakistani ethnomusicologist Adam Nayyar also won silver medal at the Florence Film.  Yves Billon made a 52-minute documentary in 1992 in English/French on the music of Bismillah Khan and showed him as one of the greatest shehnai players who changed the status of shehnai from a common court instrument to that of a classical solo instrument. The film was set along the banks of Ganges, in the mystical Varanasi.The day the shehnai died. Aijaz Gul Festival

Credits
Far from Fidel, Director
De sol a sol, Screenplay
La Guerre de pacification en Amazonie, Director & Producer
Chronique du temps Sec, Director & Producer
De sol a sol, Director & Producer
Ali Farka Toure: Ca coule de source, Director, Producer & Screenplay
Benares, musique du Gange, Director

References

External links

French film directors
Living people
1946 births